Guardians of the Galaxy: Cosmic Rewind is an enclosed roller coaster at Epcot at Walt Disney World, manufactured by Dutch company Vekoma. Based on the Marvel Cinematic Universe Guardians of the Galaxy films, the attraction is the first at Walt Disney World to feature characters from the Marvel Universe. Opened on May 27, 2022, it is Epcot's first roller coaster and Disney's first backwards-launched roller coaster. It replaced the Universe of Energy pavilion, which closed on August 13, 2017.

Originally set to open in 2021, the attraction was delayed to summer 2022 as part of Epcot's 40th anniversary celebration, which is part of Walt Disney World's 50th Anniversary celebration. The opening was postponed when Walt Disney World closed due to the COVID-19 pandemic.

History

The attraction was announced as part of an overhaul of Epcot at the 2017 D23 Expo. Ellen's Energy Adventure closed on August 13, 2017 and construction of the roller coaster began later in the same month. The show building that housed Universe of Energy was reused and retrofitted for the new attraction. The roller coaster itself is housed in a new, massive show building situated backstage behind the Universe of Energy building and the PLAY! pavilion, which utilized 960 truckloads of concrete for its foundation. The first track piece of the ride was installed November 2018.

At D23 Japan in 2018, it was confirmed that the ride would be one of the world's longest enclosed roller coasters, set to open during the 50th anniversary celebration of Walt Disney World, late 2021.

The name of the ride, Guardians of the Galaxy: Cosmic Rewind, was announced on August 25, 2019, at the D23 Expo 2019. Much like its sister attraction Guardians of the Galaxy – Mission: Breakout! at Disney's California Adventure, the attraction cannot use the Marvel brand in its title or in advertising due to the 1994 contract with Universal Parks & Resorts, which pre-dates Disney's 2009 purchase of Marvel Entertainment.

Filming for the ride commenced in October 2021. Guardians of the Galaxy film series cast members Chris Pratt, Zoe Saldaña, Dave Bautista, and Glenn Close reprised their roles from the Marvel Cinematic Universe (MCU) as Peter Quill / Star-Lord, Gamora, Drax, and Nova Prime Irani Rael, respectively. The first footage from the ride was released in March 2022. Disney Parks, through social media, also revealed on April 25, 2022, that actor Terry Crews would be part of the pre-show experience, playing Centurion Tal Marik, a new character created specifically for the attraction.

Cast Member previews for the attraction began on April 17, 2022, while Walt Disney World Annual Passholders received an early look at the ride beginning on May 8, 2022. The attraction eventually held its grand opening ceremony on May 27, 2022, opening to the public on the same day. Similar to the attractions within Avengers Campus, the attraction is inspired by, but not canonical to, the MCU.

On June 23, 2022, Disney announced that Cosmic Rewind would receive a Christmas overlay with a holiday mixtape soundtrack, featuring "a mash-up of seasonal jams". The limited offering began on November 25, 2022, coinciding with the release of The Guardians of the Galaxy Holiday Special on Disney+ the same day, running until December 30, 2022.

Attraction

The attraction is presented as the Wonders of Xandar Pavilion, the first Other-world Pavilion at Epcot. Much like the pavilions at the World Showcase, it features exhibits and models of the history and culture of the capital of the Nova Empire, Xandar, presented by the Nova Corps as a cultural exchange from them to the people of Terra (the name by which they refer to Earth). At the entrance of the attraction sits a Starblaster ship of the Xandarian Nova Corps on a perch.

Queue
The queue begins in the "Galaxarium", a galaxy-equivalent to a planetarium, where a Xandarian super computer named World Mind explains how they are learning about the culture of Terrans (as the Xandarians refer to the inhabitants of Earth). The queue continues up a ramp into the gallery that features a projection mapping model of Xandar, along with screens showcasing their culture, noting the similarities of the capital of the Nova Empire with Walt Disney's EPCOT concept. Along the gallery, models of Xandarian ships are also displayed, as well as uniforms of the Nova Corps high-ranking officers and interviews with each member of the Guardians of the Galaxy, especially Peter Quill / Star-Lord, who exclaims his excitement to go back and experience the attractions he visited as a child at EPCOT, unaware that the ones he mentions no longer exist.

Pre-show
At the end of the gallery, Terrans are ushered to the final stop of the Wonders of Xandar Pavilion, hosted by Nova Prime Irani Rael (portrayed by Glenn Close) of the Nova Corps. She welcomes the guests and begins by explaining how both Xandar and Terra were born of the same moment - the Big Bang. She then details how the Xandarians travelled through the galaxy to reach Terra to showcase their culture: by utilizing a Cosmic Generator, a piece of Xandarian technology that creates "jumpholes" that allowed them to create shortcuts to reach their destination much quicker. As a culmination of the Wonders of Xandar Pavilion, Terrans will be teleported to a Nova ship in space to demonstrate the Cosmic Generator. After Nova Prime's presentation, Centurion Tal Marik (portrayed by Terry Crews) of the Nova Corps, welcomes Terrans and advises the prohibition of communication devices with recording capabilities (i.e. cellphones and smartphones), after which Terrans are ushered into the teleportation chamber.

After Terrans have been teleported to the Nova ship, the Cosmic Generator is stolen and the ship loses its power before a demonstration could be presented, prompting Nova Prime to urgently call the Guardians of the Galaxy for help. Peter Quill / Star-Lord (portrayed by Chris Pratt), Gamora (portrayed by Zoe Saldaña), Drax (portrayed by Dave Bautista), Rocket and Groot all appear on screen answering the distress call, only to discover that a Celestial named Eson, seen outside the Nova ship, has stolen the Cosmic Generator. Unhappy with the Terrans, the Celestial uses the Cosmic Generator to send Terra through a jumppoint to the dawn of time, with the intention of erasing its existence, before entering the jumppoint itself.

Quill urges Centurion Tal Marik to follow Eson while the Guardians rendezvous with the Nova ship to stop the Celestial but is unable to do so due to the lack of power in the ship and needing to send Terrans to evacuation shuttles. However, Rocket suggests he can control the shuttles to have the Terrans follow Eson via jumpholes and rendezvous with them instead, as they are their only way of tracking the Celestial in order to recover the Cosmic Generator. Terrans are then led to the corridors of the loading platforms to board their evacuation shuttles.

Ride experience

As the shuttles depart, Terrans begin making their way out of the Nova ship to enter the jumppoint in their evacuation shuttles. Peter Quill / Star-Lord and Gamora assure them that they're tracking the shuttles to meet them, while Drax and Rocket instead make pessimistic remarks about the situation. The Guardians wish the Terrans luck as they set off, and after crossing the jumppoint the Terrans arrive at Eson's location, where it holds the Cosmic Generator. Shortly after, the Guardians of the Galaxy arrive in their ship as Eson prepares to throw the Cosmic Generator towards Terra, who disregards Quill's music from the Guardians' ship as "noise". The Guardians then blast the Cosmic Generator from the Celestial's hands, opening another jumppoint which proceeds to suck everything in, taking them all the way back in time to the Big Bang and eventually fading into complete darkness. Suddenly, the evacuation shuttles are launched backwards in an explosion, and it is at this point that the vehicles begin their spinning profiles on their axis to achieve a sensation of "space travel" while the story develops around them with a randomized song selection out of six.

As the evacuation shuttles travel through multiple jumpholes along the way, the Guardians of the Galaxy engage in combat with Eson around the Terrans as they also cross multiple jumppoints. The Guardians finally lead a fleet of Nova Corp Starblasters to Eson, who manage to contain the Celestial and recover the Cosmic Generator. As the Guardians of the Galaxy travel far from the scene, they lead the Terrans to a final series of jumpholes that takes them to the Milky Way, then around the Moon before locking the coordinates for EPCOT and sending them back to Terra. As they arrive, Peter Quill welcomes the Terrans to the Guardians of the Galaxy, the rest of the team remarking amongst themselves as they disembark.

Cast
Actors from the Guardians of the Galaxy films reprised their roles for the attraction. Terry Crews plays a new character created specifically for the attraction.

 Chris Pratt as Peter Quill / Star-Lord
 Zoe Saldana as Gamora
 Dave Bautista as Drax the Destroyer
 Glenn Close as Nova Prime Irani Rael
 Terry Crews as Centurion Tal Marik
 Kevin Michael Richardson as Eson the Searcher

Music
Like in the Guardians of the Galaxy films, music plays a key role in the attraction. Over a hundred songs were considered by Walt Disney Imagineering for the ride experience, narrowing it down to six randomly-selected featured songs, each fitting the same motion profile of the ride vehicles:

 "Disco Inferno" by the Trammps
 "I Ran (So Far Away)" by A Flock of Seagulls
 "Conga" by Miami Sound Machine
 "Everybody Wants to Rule the World" by Tears for Fears
 "One Way or Another" by Blondie
 "September" by Earth, Wind and Fire

Additionally, Tyler Bates, composer of Guardians of the Galaxy and Guardians of the Galaxy: Vol. 2, scored over two hours of original music for the queue. An electric guitar cover of the original Universe of Energy attraction's theme song (written by Joel Hirschhorn and Al Kasha) can also be heard before the attraction's backwards launch.

Christmas overlay
On June 23, 2022, Disney announced that Cosmic Rewind would receive a Christmas overlay with a holiday mixtape soundtrack. On October 7, 2022, at New York Comic Con, Disney announced the overlay’s title: Guardians of the Galaxy: Cosmic Rewind Holiday Remix. The limited offering began on November 25, 2022, coinciding with the release of The Guardians of the Galaxy Holiday Special on Disney+ the same day, running until December 30, 2022. The attraction's soundtrack was replaced by "Run Rudolph Run", with the lyrics changed to reflect Rocket, titled "Run Run Rocket".

See also
 Guardians of the Galaxy – Mission: Breakout!
 Avengers Campus
 Marvel Super Hero Island

References

External links

Amusement rides based on works by James Gunn
Roller coasters introduced in 2022
Enclosed roller coasters
Launched roller coasters
Epcot
Guardians of the Galaxy (film series)
Marvel Cinematic Universe amusement rides
Marvel Comics in amusement parks
Roller coasters in Greater Orlando
Roller coasters operated by Walt Disney Parks and Resorts
Walt Disney Parks and Resorts attractions
World Discovery
2022 establishments in Florida